"Poor Susan" is a lyric poem by William Wordsworth composed at Alfoxden in 1797. It was first published in the collection Lyrical Ballads in 1798. It is written in anapestic tetrameter.

The poem records the memories awakening in a country girl in London on hearing a thrush sing in the early morning.

Text 

At the corner of Wood-Street, when day-light appears,
There's a Thrush that sings loud, it has sung for three years.
Poor Susan has pass'd by the spot and has heard
In the silence of morning the song of the bird.

'Tis a note of enchantment; what ails her? She sees
A mountain ascending, a vision of trees;
Bright volumes of vapour through Lothbury glide,
And a river flows on through the vale of Cheapside.

Green pastures she views in the midst of the dale,
Down which she so often has tripp'd with her pail,
And a single small cottage, a nest like a dove's,
The only one dwelling on earth that she loves.

She looks, and her heart is in Heaven, but they fade,
The mist and the river, the hill and the shade;
The stream will not flow, and the hill will not rise,
And the colours have all pass'd away from her eyes.

Poor Outcast! return—to receive thee once more
The house of thy Father will open its door,
And thou once again, in thy plain russet gown,
Mayst hear the thrush sing from a tree of its own.

History 
In Wordsworth's Preface to the Lyrical Ballads, the poet states:

Charles Lamb objected to the final stanza:  According to Ernest de Sélincourt, Wordsworth responded by deleting the stanza in the 1815 edition of his poems and renaming the poem The Reverie of Poor Susan, a title which may have been influenced by his reading Bürger's Des Arme Suschens Traum at Goslar. In addition he replaced the word There's at the beginning of the second line by Hangs and added an introductory note: 

However, Peter J. Manning pointed out that:

References

Bibliography 
 Davies, Hunter. William Wordsworth, Weidenfeld and Nicolson 1980
 Gill, Stephen. William Wordsworth: A Life, Oxford University Press 1989
 Moorman, Mary. William Wordsworth, A Biography: The Early Years, 1770-1803 v. 1, Oxford University Press 1957
 Moorman, Mary. William Wordsworth: A Biography: The Later Years, 1803-50 v. 2, Oxford University Press 1965

External links 

Internet archive of Lyrical Ballads

Poetry by William Wordsworth
1804 poems
1807 poems
1815 poems